"Pie-O-My" is the 44th episode of the HBO original series The Sopranos and the fifth of the show's fourth season. Written by Robin Green and Mitchell Burgess, and directed by Henry J. Bronchtein, it originally aired on October 13, 2002.

Starring
 James Gandolfini as Tony Soprano
 Lorraine Bracco as Dr. Jennifer Melfi *
 Edie Falco as Carmela Soprano
 Michael Imperioli as Christopher Moltisanti
 Dominic Chianese as Corrado Soprano, Jr. 
 Steven Van Zandt as Silvio Dante 
 Tony Sirico as Paulie Gualtieri *
 Robert Iler as Anthony Soprano, Jr. *
 Jamie-Lynn Sigler as Meadow Soprano 
 Drea de Matteo as Adriana La Cerva
 Aida Turturro as Janice Soprano
 Federico Castelluccio as Furio Giunta *
 Steven R. Schirripa as Bobby Baccalieri
 and Joe Pantoliano as Ralph Cifaretto

Guest starring
 Jerry Adler as Hesh Rabkin

Also guest starring

Synopsis

Adriana realizes that her club is not entirely hers, as the back rooms are freely used by Tony and his crew for business. Her FBI handlers, including her new contact Robyn Sanseverino, are pressing her for information. They tell her that Christopher is associating with dangerous criminals, and she can help him; they also cause her to doubt that Richie and Pussy are in witness protection. She gives away a little information about Patsy. At home, she relieves stress with heroin.

Janice is insinuating herself into Bobby's family life: she freezes out Mikey Palmice's widow JoJo, and serves the family Carmela's delicious lasagna, claiming it as her own. She urges Bobby to get over his grief as he might lose Junior's support. Bobby pulls himself together and completes a neglected task for Junior: meeting with a union shop steward to intimidate him into changing his vote in an upcoming election.

Tony and Carmela are still bitterly divided about their investments. He refuses to sign the life insurance trust she proposes, having been advised it is too much in her favor. She receives a stock tip, but when he comes up with the money, it is too late.

Ralphie's racehorse, Pie-O-My, wins and he happily shares the winnings with Tony, who demands a bigger share for the next race, to Ralphie's chagrin. Veterinarian's fees pile up, and one night when Pie-O-My is very sick, the vet refuses further treatment unless he is paid. Ralphie refuses and passes along Tony's number, and he rushes to the stables and pays. He then goes into the stall and sits with Pie-O-My, gently petting and reassuring her.

First appearances
 Agent Robyn Sanseverino: The F.B.I. agent assigned to handle Adriana.

Title reference
The episode's title is the name of Ralph's racehorse, Pie-O-My.

References to other media or events
 At the stables, Hesh references Seabiscuit, who was, at the time, a frequent pop culture reference due to the popularity of the book about him. This episode aired before the release of the 2003 motion picture of the same name.
 In a scene where Adriana was at home watching television, she was watching a Body by Jake infomercial.
While discussing the trust Carmela is trying to set up, Tony mentioned "floats like a butterfly, stings like a bee", which is in reference to Muhammad Ali.
 When Junior is putting on his sweater in preparation for his trial he says “It's a beautiful day in this neighborhood” which is a reference to Mister Rogers’ Neighborhood.

Music
 The song played over the end credits is "My Rifle, My Pony and Me" by Dean Martin and Ricky Nelson, from the 1959 Western Rio Bravo. Tony is seen watching this movie (and specifically, the scene in which the song appears) in the Season Four premiere, "For All Debts Public and Private".
 The song heard from A.J.'s room when Tony is in bed is "The Gift That Keeps On Giving" by Deicide from their album Insineratehymn.
 Snake River Conspiracy's cover of The Cure's "Lovesong" plays in the Crazy Horse club.
 The song played when Bobby goes into Dorley's Lounge to speak with Teddy about the union vote is "Theme for an Imaginary Western" by Mountain.
 The song playing in the Crazy Horse club when Adrianna walks in on Tony and Ralph in her office is "Can't Stand It" by The Greenhornes.

External links
"Pie-O-My"  at HBO

The Sopranos (season 4) episodes
2002 American television episodes